Qoli Beyglu may refer to:
 Qoli Beyglu, Ardabil
 Qoli Beyglu, East Azerbaijan